The 1983 McDonald's All-American Boys Game was an All-star basketball game played on Saturday, April 9, 1983 at the Omni Coliseum in Atlanta, Georgia. The game's rosters featured the best and most highly recruited high school boys graduating in 1983. The game was the 6th annual version of the McDonald's All-American Game first played in 1978.

1983 game
The East team could count on the two top guards from the state of New York: Kenny Smith and Dwayne "Pearl" Washington, and also had several of the top 10 players of the class. The West had top-ranked forward Winston Bennett and center Joe Wolf. The East dominated the first half and at halftime led the score 73 to 62. The West came back during the second half, guided by two Kentucky commits: James Blackmon and Winston Bennett. With 4:31 remaining, the West was still 11 points behind, but an 11-0 run tied the score. The decisive layup was scored by Blackmon with 9 seconds remaining on the clock: Dwayne Washington scored a layup with 1 second left, but the officials called a charge and the basket did not count. The West won the game 115 to 113: Washington (11 points and 8 assists) was named MVP together with Bennett, who scored 21 points. Other players who had good performances were Tom Sheehey (the top scorer of the game with 22 points), Blackmon (21 points), Bruce Dalrymple (16) and Michael Smith (15). Of the 25 players, 12 went on to play at least 1 game in the NBA.

East roster

West roster

Coaches
The East team was coached by:
 Head Coach Buddy Gardler of Cardinal O'Hara High School (Philadelphia, Pennsylvania)

The West team was coached by:
 Head Coach Joe Treat of Bryant High School (Bryant, Arkansas)

References

External links
McDonald's All-American on the web
McDonald's All-American all-time rosters
McDonald's All-American rosters at Basketball-Reference.com
Game stats at Realgm.com

1982–83 in American basketball
1983
1983 in sports in Georgia (U.S. state)
Basketball competitions in Atlanta
1980s in Atlanta